Domremy Beach is a hamlet on the northern shore of Wakaw Lake in Hoodoo No. 401, Saskatchewan, Canada. The hamlet is located about 15 km east of Highway 2 on Township road 432, approximately 20 km east of the Town of Wakaw.

See also

 List of communities in Saskatchewan
 Hamlets of Saskatchewan

References

External links

Hoodoo No. 401, Saskatchewan
Unincorporated communities in Saskatchewan
Division No. 15, Saskatchewan